Qaralar (also, Karalar) is a village and municipality in the Imishli Rayon of Azerbaijan.  It has a population of 3,360.

References 

Populated places in Imishli District